was a Prefectural Natural Park in southern Ōita Prefecture, Japan. Established in 1951, the park spanned the municipalities of Bungo-ōno, Saiki, and Taketa. In 2017 it was incorporated into the Sobo, Katamuki and Okue Biosphere Reserve.

See also
 National Parks of Japan
 Sobo-Katamuki Quasi-National Park
 Sobo Katamuki Prefectural Natural Park (Miyazaki)

References

External links
  Map of Sobo Katamuki Prefectural Natural Park

Parks and gardens in Ōita Prefecture
Protected areas established in 1951
1951 establishments in Japan
Bungo-ōno, Ōita